Hereford Arizona Observatory (HAO), IAU-code G95, is an astronomical observatory, owned and operated by amateur astronomer Bruce L. Gary. Observational studies of unusual starlight fluctuations in Tabby's Star (KIC 8462852) and WD 1145+017 are recent interests.

HAO consists of two telescopes, in two separate observatory installations: HAO#1 (contains a Celestron CPC 1100, 11-inch Schmidt-Cassegrain telescope on an equatorial mount) and HAO#2 (contains an Astro-Tech Ritchey–Chrétien, 16-inch telescope on an equatorial mount).

Gallery

See also 

 List of astronomical observatories
 List of observatory codes
 Tabby's Star (KIC 8462852) − oddly dimming star
 WD 1145+017 - star destroying planetesimal, producing a dusty disk

References

External links 
 Official HAO WebSite
 Bruce L. Gary WebSites
 Bruce L. Gary (GoogleScholar)
 Amateur Exoplanet Archive (AXA)
 Hereford Arizona Observatory (NatureIndex)
 NASA Asteroid and Comet Watch Site
 Near Earth Asteroid Tracking (NEAT)

Astronomical observatories in Arizona
Buildings and structures in Cochise County, Arizona
Discoverers of comets